Martin County High School is a public high school in Stuart, Florida, USA, in the Martin County School District. The school enrolled 2,079 students in a 2012 census. In 2022, it was a "B" rated school through the Florida Department of Education. 

The school is home to two signature programs: Cambridge International Advanced Program and the Career & Technical Programs Students are eligible to participate in the Indian River State College Dual Enrollment program to simultaneously earn high school credits and college credits. 

Its mascot is the tiger and its colors are blue and gold. The principal is Alfred Fabrizio.

Student Enrollment & Demographics 
In 2022, enrollment was 2,315 students in grades 9 through 12. The student body is 90% White, 5% Black, 2% Asian American, and 3% Other. 41.89% of students are receiving meals at Free or Reduced Status. There are 120 teachers with a student ratio of 1:19.

In 2022, 47% of students took at least one Advanced Placement (AP) exam. 25% passed at least one AP exam.

Notable alumni
Dan Bakkedahl – actor/comedian
Kelly Carrington (Kelly Hemberger) – Playboy Playmate October 2008
Amanda Cerny – Playboy Playmate October 2011
Paul Denino – YouTuber and live streamer
Derek Fathauer – American professional golfer
Forest K. Ferguson – University of Florida athlete in football, boxing and track and field; received U.S. Army's Distinguished Service Cross for "extraordinary heroism" on D-Day
Kevin Kelly – New Japan Pro Wrestling play-by-play announcer
Omar Mateen – Islamic terrorist and mass murderer who perpetrated the Pulse Orlando nightclub shooting
Scott Proctor – Major League Baseball pitcher
Judge Reinhold – actor, played in Beverly Hills Cop series with Eddie Murphy
Ken Russell - Miami City Commissioner
Justin Simmons – American football player for the Denver Broncos

References

External links
 

High schools in Martin County, Florida
Martin County School District
Public high schools in Florida
Stuart, Florida
1964 establishments in Florida
Educational institutions established in 1964